Whispers and Moans may refer to:
 Whispers and Moans (film), a 2007 film by Herman Yau
 "Whispers and Moans", a song by Crowded House from Woodface